The Waltham Land Trust is a private, non-profit corporation that seeks to preserve open space in Waltham, Massachusetts.  The trust currently sponsors many projects, including the protection of the grounds of the former Gaebler Children's Center.

External links
Official Waltham Land Trust website

Waltham, Massachusetts
Land trusts in Massachusetts